Richard Brett (1567–1637) was an English clergyman and academic. During the translation of the King James Version of the Bible, Brett served in the "First Oxford Company", responsible for the later books of the Old Testament

Life

From a family of Catholic recusant sympathies, Richard was the son of Robert Brett, gent., of Whitestaunton Manor in Somerset. He was born in London. He attended Hart Hall, Oxford which he entered as a commoner in 1582. He was appointed Rector of Quainton, Buckinghamshire, in 1595. That same year, he was granted a Fellowship in Lincoln College under Richard Kilby, where he pursued his study of Latin, Greek, Aramaic, Arabic, Hebrew, and Ge'ez (Ethiopic) tongues. In 1597 he was admitted bachelor of divinity, and he proceeded in divinity in 1605.

He died in Quainton on 5 April 1637, aged 70, and is buried in the chancel of Quainton Church, which he served for 43 years. Over his grave a monument with his effigies and a Latin and English epitaph was erected by his widow. His will was proved in P.C.C. in June 1637. By his wife Alice, daughter of Richard Brown, sometime mayor of Oxford, he left four daughters, of whom Margaret married Calybute Downing in 1627.

Works
His scholarly publications were in Latin.

Two translations from Greek into Latin: 
Vitæ sanctorum Evangelistarum Johannis et Lucæ à Simeone Metaphraste concinnatæ, Oxford, 1597.
Agatharchidis et Memnonis historicorum quæ supersunt omnia, Oxford, 1597. 
Iconum sacrarum Decas in quâ è subjectis typis compluscula sanæ doctrinæ capita eruuntur (Joseph Barnes, Oxford 1603).

References
 McClure, Alexander. (1858) The Translators Revived: A Biographical Memoir of the Authors of the English Version of the Holy Bible. Mobile, Alabama: R. E. Publications (republished by the Marantha Bible Society, 1984 ASIN B0006YJPI8 )
 Nicolson, Adam. (2003) God's Secretaries: The Making of the King James Bible. New York: HarperCollins

Notes

Further reading
 Stanley M. Burstein, "Richard Brett," in volume 1 of Dictionary of British Classicists, ed. Robert Todd et al. (Bristol: Thoemmes, 2004), pp. 104–05.
Attribution

1567 births
1637 deaths
Alumni of Hertford College, Oxford
Fellows of Lincoln College, Oxford
Translators of the King James Version
Anglican clergy from London
16th-century English translators
17th-century English translators
16th-century English clergy
17th-century English Anglican priests
17th-century Anglican theologians
16th-century Anglican theologians
Greek–Latin translators